Atraco a las tres  (Robbery at 3 o'clock) is a 1962 Spanish comedy film directed  by José María Forqué.

It is inspired by Mario Monicelli's masterpiece Big Deal on Madonna Street.

Plot
Fernando Galindo, a bank clerk, persuades his colleagues to rob the bank where they work in revenge for manager's dismissal and poor employment conditions. They decide to fake a robbery similar to those featured in films. Despite their careful preparation, the plan fails because a band of real robbers burst into the bank the same day they had planned to carry out their raid.

Cast
José Luis López Vázquez as Fernando Galindo
Casto Sendra 'Cassen' as Martínez
Gracita Morales as Enriqueta
Katia Loritz as Katia Durán
Manuel Alexandre as Benítez
Agustín González as Cordero
Manuel Díaz González as Don Prudencio
José Orjas as Don Felipe
Alfredo Landa as Castrillo
Rafaela Aparicio
Lola Gaos

External links
 

1962 films
1960s Spanish-language films
Spanish black-and-white films
Spanish crime comedy films
Films directed by José María Forqué
1960s crime comedy films
Films with screenplays by Rafael J. Salvia
1962 comedy films
1960s Spanish films
Spanish heist films